Zumstein may refer to:

 Zumstein catalog, postage stamp catalog from Switzerland
 Matthias Zumstein, (born 1973), Swiss handball player
 Zumsteins, locality in western Victoria, Australia
 Punta Zumstein, peak in the Pennine Alps on the border between Italy and Switzerland